The Searle–Derrida debate refers to a famous exchange between John Searle and Jacques Derrida regarding speech-act theory. In his 1972 paper "Signature Event Context", Derrida criticized J. L. Austin's theory of the illocutionary act; in his 1977 essay Reiterating the Differences: A Reply to Derrida, Searle argued that Derrida's critique of Austin was unwarranted. Searle later refused to let his 1977 ″reply″ be printed along with Derrida's papers in the 1988 collection Limited Inc — in which a second text by Derrida ridiculed Searle's positions on the topic. Searle clarified in the 1990s that he did not consider Derrida's approach to be legitimate philosophy.

Commentators have sometimes interpreted the seemingly failed nature of the exchange between Searle and Derrida as a prominent example of a confrontation between analytical and continental philosophy, some having considered it as a series of elaborate misunderstandings while others have seen either Searle or Derrida gaining the upper hand. While the fundamental opposition between the two philosophers lay in their different understanding of intentionality, the debate is famous for its degree of mutual hostility, which be seen from Searle's statement that "It would be a mistake to regard Derrida's discussion of Austin as a confrontation between two prominent philosophical traditions", to which Derrida replied that that sentence was "the only sentence of the 'reply' to which I can subscribe".

"Signature Event Context" (1972)   
While sympathetic to Austin's departure from a purely denotational account of language to one that includes "force", Derrida was sceptical of the framework of normativity employed by Austin. He argued that the focus on intentionality in speech-act theory was misguided because intentionality is restricted to that which is already established as a possible intention. 

Derrida argued that Austin had missed the fact that any speech event is framed by a "structure of absence" (the words that are left unsaid due to contextual constraints) and by "iterability" (the repeatability of linguistic elements outside of their context). He also took issue with the way Austin had excluded the study of fiction, non-serious or "parasitic" speech, wondering whether this exclusion was because Austin had considered these speech genres governed by different structures of meaning, or simply due to a lack of interest.

John Searle's defence of Austin 
In his 1977 essay Reiterating the Differences: A Reply to Derrida, Searle argued that Derrida's critique was unwarranted because it assumed that Austin's theory attempted to give a full account of language and meaning when its aim was much narrower. Searle considered the omission of parasitic discourse forms to be justified by the narrow scope of Austin's inquiry. Searle also argued that Derrida's disagreement with Austin turned on his having misunderstood Austin's (and Peirce's) type–token distinction and his failure to understand Austin's concept of failure in relation to performativity.

Searle agreed with Derrida's proposal that intentionality presupposes iterability, but did not apply the same concept of intentionality used by Derrida, being unable or unwilling to engage with the continental conceptual apparatus. This, in turn, caused Derrida to criticize Searle for not being sufficiently familiar with phenomenological perspectives on intentionality. 

Critics have suggested that Searle, by being so grounded in the analytical tradition that he was unable to engage with Derrida's continental phenomenological tradition, was at fault for the unsuccessful nature of the exchange.

The substance of Searle's criticism of Derrida in relation to topics in the philosophy of language—referenced in Derrida's Signature Event Context—was that Derrida had no apparent familiarity with contemporary philosophy of language nor of contemporary linguistics in Anglo-Saxon countries.  Searle explains, "When Derrida writes about the philosophy of language he refers typically to Rousseau and Condillac, not to mention Plato. And his idea of a "modern linguist" is Benveniste or even Saussure."  Searle describes Derrida's philosophical knowledge as pre-Wittgensteinian—that is to say, disconnected from analytic tradition—and consequently, in his perspective, naive and misguided, concerned with issues long-since resolved or otherwise found to be non-issues.

Searle also wrote in The New York Review of Books that he was surprised by "the low level of philosophical argumentation, the deliberate obscurantism of the prose, the wildly exaggerated claims, and the constant striving to give the appearance of profundity by making claims that seem paradoxical, but under analysis often turn out to be silly or trivial."

Derrida's response  
Claiming that a clear sender of Searle's message could not be established, Derrida in Limited Inc suggested that Searle had formed with Austin a société à responsabilité limitée (a "limited liability company") due to the ways in which the ambiguities of authorship within Searle's reply circumvented the very speech act of his reply. Searle did not respond. Later in 1988, Derrida tried to review his position and his critiques of Austin and Searle, reiterating that he found the constant appeal to "normality" in the analytical tradition to be problematic from which they were only paradigmatic examples.

He continued arguing how problematic was establishing the relation between "nonfiction or standard discourse" and "fiction," defined as its "parasite", "for part of the most original essence of the latter is to allow fiction, the simulacrum, parasitism, to take place-and in so doing to 'de-essentialize' itself as it were". 
He would finally argue that the indispensable question would then become:

In the debate, Derrida praises Austin's work, but argues that he is wrong to banish what Austin calls "infelicities" from the "normal" operation of language. One "infelicity," for instance, occurs when it cannot be known whether a given speech act is "sincere" or "merely citational" (and therefore possibly ironic, etc.). Derrida argues that every iteration is necessarily "citational", due to the graphematic nature of speech and writing, and that language could not work at all without the ever-present and ineradicable possibility of such alternate readings. Derrida takes Searle to task for his attempt to get around this issue by grounding final authority in the speaker's inaccessible "intention". Derrida argues that intention cannot possibly govern how an iteration signifies, once it becomes hearable or readable. All speech acts borrow a language whose significance is determined by historical-linguistic context, and by the alternate possibilities that this context makes possible. This significance, Derrida argues, cannot be altered or governed by the whims of intention.

Searle's critique of deconstruction
In 1994, Searle argued that the ideas upon which deconstruction is founded are essentially a consequence of a series of conceptual confusions made by Derrida as a result of his outdated knowledge or are merely banalities.  He insisted that Derrida's conception of iterability and its alleged corrupting effect on meaning stems from Derrida's ignorance of the type–token distinction that exists in current linguistics and philosophy of language. As Searle explains, "Most importantly, from the fact that different tokens of a sentence type can be uttered on different occasions with different intentions, that is, different speaker meanings, nothing of any significance follows about the original speaker meaning of the original utterance token."

In 1995, Searle gave a brief reply to Derrida in The Construction of Social Reality. "Derrida, as far as I can tell, does not have an argument. He simply declares that there is nothing outside of texts (Il n'y a pas de 'hors-texte''')." Then, in Limited Inc., Derrida "apparently takes it all back", claiming that he meant only "the banality that everything exists in some context or other!" Derrida and others like him present "an array of weak or even nonexistent arguments for a conclusion that seems preposterous". Searle's reference here is not to anything forwarded in the debate, but to a mistranslation of the phrase "il n'y a pas de hors-texte" ("there is no outside-text"), which appears in Derrida's Of Grammatology.

In Of Grammatology (1967), Derrida had stated that a text must not be interpreted by reference to anything "outside of language", which for him means "outside of writing in general". He adds: "There is nothing outside of the text [there is no outside-text; il n'y a pas de hors-texte]" (brackets in the translation). This is a metaphor: un hors-texte is a bookbinding term, referring to a 'plate' bound among pages of text. Searle cites Derrida's supplementary metaphor rather than his initial contention. However, whether Searle's objection is good against that contention is the point in debate.

According to Searle, the consistent pattern of Derrida's rhetoric is: 
(a) announce a preposterous thesis, e.g. "there is no outside-text" (il n'y a pas de hors-texte); 
(b) when challenged on (a) respond that you have been misunderstood and revise the claim in (a) such that it becomes a truism, e.g. "' means nothing else: there is nothing outside contexts"; 
(c) when the reformulation from (b) is acknowledged then proceed as if the original formulation from (a) was accepted. The revised idea—for example that everything exists in some context—is a banality, but a charade ensues as if the original claim—nothing exists outside of text [sic]—had been established.

See also
Searle on intentionality

References

Further reading
Moati Raoul (2009), Derrida/Searle, déconstruction et langage ordinaire.

External links
Mackey, Louis (1984) with a reply by Searle. An Exchange on Deconstruction, in New York Review of Books, 2 February 1984.
Searle (1983). The Word Turned Upside Down, in The New York Review of Books, October 1983.
Searle (2000). Reality Principles: An Interview with John R. Searle''. Reason.com. February 2000 issue. Retrieved 30 August 2010.
Koblizek (2012), Tomas: How to Make the Concepts Clear: Searle's Discussion with Derrida. Organon F, Suppl. Issue 2, pp.157–165. (Searle's reply to Koblizek: ibid., pp.217–220.).

Philosophical debates
Continental philosophy
Analytic philosophy
Jacques Derrida
Philosophy of language